Philip Watkins McKinney (March 17, 1832 – March 1, 1899) was an American lawyer, soldier and politician.  McKinney served in the Virginia House of Delegates, was the Commonwealth attorney for Prince Edward County, and was elected as the 41st Governor of Virginia, serving from 1890 to 1894.

Early life
Born in New Store, in Buckingham County, Virginia, Philip McKinney was the son of Charles and Martha McKinney.  His undergraduate education was at Hampden–Sydney College, where he graduated with honors in 1851.  McKinney then studied law at Washington College under John White Brockenbrough.  After graduating, he started the practice of law and was married twice, first to Ann Fleming Christian and then to Annie Clay, with each marriage producing one child.

War and politics
In 1858, McKinney was elected to the Virginia House of Delegates, representing Buckingham County.  However, at the outbreak of the Civil War, he joined the Confederate army as an officer in Company K of the 4th Virginia Cavalry.  He sustained a serious injury in 1863 at the Battle of Brandy Station, thus ending his fighting career.

After the war, McKinney started a law practice in Farmville, but soon returned to politics.  He served multiple terms as the Commonwealth Attorney for Prince Edward County throughout the next twenty years.  However, he also lost a number of electoral campaigns during that time, including for U.S. Congress, Virginia Attorney General and Governor.

McKinney ran for Governor for the second time in 1889, this time soundly beating Republican William Mahone, with McKinney winning 57.19% of the vote.  The central theme of McKinney's gubernatorial campaign was white supremacy and the danger of African-American advancement.  Once elected, his primary focus as Governor was on developing the state economy and increasing the power of the Virginia Democratic party.

After leaving office, McKinney retired to private life, settling with his wife in Farmville, Virginia.  He died there in 1899 and was interred at Farmville Cemetery.  His Queen-Anne-style house still stands in Farmville.

References

External links
A Guide to the Executive papers of Governor Phillip W. McKinney, 1889-1893 (bulk 1890-1893) at The Library of Virginia
National Governors Association biography

1832 births
1899 deaths
Democratic Party governors of Virginia
People from Buckingham County, Virginia
Hampden–Sydney College alumni
People of Virginia in the American Civil War
Confederate States Army officers
19th-century American politicians
19th-century American lawyers
Democratic Party members of the Virginia House of Delegates
County and city Commonwealth's Attorneys in Virginia
People from Farmville, Virginia